Beatsystem is the name of British electronic musician Derek Pierce. Two of his singles charted on the UK Singles Chart in the early 1990s; a cover of Lou Reed's "Walk on the Wild Side" which peaked at No. 63 in March 1990 and "To a Brighter Day (O' Happy Day)" at No. 70 in September 1993.

In the mid-1990s, his work shifted from electronic dance/house to experimental ambient music, releasing his debut album 2297 on the Nottingham-based ambient label Em:t Records.

Discography

Albums
Beatsystem 2297 (1997), Em:t
The Sound of Two Eskimos Kissing (2011), Entropy Records

Singles
"Don't Hold Back on Love" (1990), 4th & Broadway
"Walk on the Wild Side" (1990), 4th & Broadway - UK #63
"To a Brighter Day (O' Happy Day)" (1993), FFRR - UK #70

References

External links

English electronic musicians
English record producers
English songwriters
Ambient musicians
FFRR Records artists